Catherine Mary Edwards (born 4 September 1948) is a former Australian politician. She was an Independent member of the Tasmanian Legislative Council from 1999 to 2001, representing Pembroke.

Born in Montreal, Quebec, Canada, Edwards received a Diploma of Physiotherapy in 1970 and a Bachelor of Arts in 1983. She was mayor of Clarence from 1989 to 2005. In 1999, she won election to the Tasmanian Legislative Council for Pembroke. She served until 2001, when she was defeated by Labor candidate Allison Ritchie.

References

1948 births
Living people
Members of the Tasmanian Legislative Council
Independent members of the Parliament of Tasmania
21st-century Australian politicians
Women members of the Tasmanian Legislative Council
Mayors of places in Tasmania
Women mayors of places in Tasmania
21st-century Australian women politicians